Obelisk Hill is a hill in southern Hong Kong. Canadian troops took positions there in 1941 in preparation for attacks from the Imperial Japanese military.

Geography 
Obelisk Hill is 164m in height and is close to the Dragon's Back Trail. On its summit, there is a plain monument whose purpose and date of construction remain a mystery.  The monument is presumed to have been built prior to 1900.

See also 

 List of mountains, peaks and hills in Hong Kong
 Dragon's Back

References

External links 

 Hong Kong Trail No. 8

Southern District, Hong Kong